Philippians 2 is the second chapter of the Epistle to the Philippians in the New Testament of the Christian Bible. It is authored by Paul the Apostle about mid-50s to early 60s AD and addressed to the Christians in Philippi. Jesuit theologian Robert Murray notes that a narrative in verses 5-11 about Christ, "who humbled himself, by becoming obedient to death" is central to this chapter. German protestant theologian Ernst Lohmeyer argued in 1928 that  were an existing hymn about Christ which Paul quotes in his letter, a theory which "has come to dominate both exegesis of Philippians and study of early Christology and credal formulas".

Text
The original text was written in Koine Greek. This chapter is divided into 30 verses.

Textual witnesses
Some early manuscripts containing the text of this chapter are:
Codex Vaticanus (AD 325-350)
Codex Sinaiticus (330-360)
Codex Alexandrinus (400-440)
Codex Ephraemi Rescriptus (~450; complete)
Codex Freerianus (~450; extant verses 1-3, 12-14, 25-27)
Codex Claromontanus (~550)

Unity of Minds and Hearts (2:1–4)
This section centers on Paul's appeal for unity of minds and hearts among the people, which can be expressed by four phrases: two using the keyword phronein ("of the same mind" or "of one mind"), then agape ("love") and sumpsuchoi ("united in soul" or "being in full accord"). Maintaining his reference to the joy which Paul already feels in respect to the Philippians ( and ), he speaks of this joy being "made full, like a measure".

Christ as the Focus and Model for Discipleship (2:5–11)
Following the exhortation in the earlier section, Christ is pointed as the model for discipleship, with a poetic narrative "beyond Paul's usual vocabulary", but not necessarily beyond his capacity.

Verse 5
Let this mind be in you which was also in Christ Jesus,
This verse uses the same word phronein ("mind") which Paul used at the start of this chapter.

Verse 6
 who, being in the form of God, did not consider it robbery to be equal with God,

Verse 7
 but made Himself of no reputation, taking the form of a bondservant, and coming in the likeness of men. 
This verse was interpreted in the following way by the theologian John Gill:
"Made Himself of no reputation": or "nevertheless emptied himself"; he lost nothing of what he had, but the glory of his divine nature was covered and hid from the people so they reputed him as a mere man.
 "Likeness": from  homoiōma; "in the likeness of men", not the likeness of the first Adam, but of "sinful flesh", and was treated as a "sinner", although he was "equal to God".

Verse 8
 And being found in appearance as a man, He humbled Himself and became obedient to the point of death, even the death of the cross.

The Desired Response (2:12–18)
Based on Christ's example, Paul exhorts the people to "work out your own salvation... for it is God who is at work".

Timothy and Epaphroditus, Paul's Go-Betweens (2:19–30)
Two of Paul's helpers, Timothy and Epaphroditus, are introduced and the reasons for their journey are explained in this part, mainly to show Paul's affection to the people of Philippi.

See also
 Epaphroditus
 Knowledge of Christ
 Timothy
 Related Bible parts: Isaiah 66, John 1, John 8, John 14, John 20, Romans 8, 2 Corinthians 8, Galatians 5, Hebrews 7

References

Sources

External links
 King James Bible - Wikisource
English Translation with Parallel Latin Vulgate
Online Bible at GospelHall.org (ESV, KJV, Darby, American Standard Version, Bible in Basic English)
Multiple bible versions at Bible Gateway (NKJV, NIV, NRSV etc.)

02